The Hervey Street Road Stone Arch Bridge is a historic stone arch bridge located in Durham, New York, United States. It was constructed in 1891 and is a single span, dry laid limestone bridge with a round arch. It spans a tributary of Thorp Creek.

It was built by Jeremiah Cunningham.

It was listed on the National Register of Historic Places in 2008.

See also

List of bridges and tunnels on the National Register of Historic Places in New York
National Register of Historic Places in Greene County, New York

References

Road bridges on the National Register of Historic Places in New York (state)
Bridges completed in 1891
Bridges in Greene County, New York
1891 establishments in New York (state)
National Register of Historic Places in Greene County, New York
Stone arch bridges in the United States